Megacraspedus is a genus of moths in the family Gelechiidae, found primarily in the Palearctic.

Species
The following species belong to the genus Megacraspedus:

 Megacraspedus albella (Amsel, 1935)
 Megacraspedus albovenata Junnilainen, 2010 g
 Megacraspedus alfacarellus Wehrli, 1926 c g
 Megacraspedus andreneli Varenne & Nel, 2014 g
 Megacraspedus argyroneurellus Staudinger, 1871 c g
 Megacraspedus armatophallus Huemer & Karsholt, 2018
 Megacraspedus attritellus Staudinger, 1871 c g
 Megacraspedus balneariellus (Chrétien, 1907) g
 Megacraspedus barcodiellus Huemer & Karsholt, 2018
 Megacraspedus bengtssoni Huemer & Karsholt, 2018
 Megacraspedus bidentatus Huemer & Karsholt, 2018
 Megacraspedus bilineatella Huemer & Karsholt, 1996 g
 Megacraspedus binotella (Duponchel, 1843) g
 Megacraspedus brachypteris Huemer & Karsholt, 2018
 Megacraspedus cerussatellus Rebel, 1930 c g
 Megacraspedus coleophorodes (Li & Zheng, 1995)
 Megacraspedus consortiella Caradja, 1920 c g
 Megacraspedus cuencellus Caradja, 1920 c g
 Megacraspedus dejectella (Staudinger, 1859) g
 Megacraspedus devorator Huemer & Karsholt, 2018
 Megacraspedus dolosellus (Zeller, 1839) c g
 Megacraspedus eburnellus Huemer & Karsholt, 2001 g
 Megacraspedus ethicodes (Meyrick, 1920)
 Megacraspedus fallax (Mann, 1867) g
 Megacraspedus faunierensis Huemer & Karsholt, 2018
 Megacraspedus feminensis Huemer & Karsholt, 2018
 Megacraspedus fuscus Huemer & Karsholt, 2018
 Megacraspedus gallicus Huemer & Karsholt, 2018
 Megacraspedus gibeauxi Huemer & Karsholt, 2018
 Megacraspedus glaberipalpus Huemer & Karsholt, 2018
 Megacraspedus golestanicus Huemer & Karsholt, 2018
 Megacraspedus granadensis Huemer & Karsholt, 2018
 Megacraspedus gredosensis Huemer & Karsholt, 2018
 Megacraspedus grisea (Filipjev, 1931)
 Megacraspedus heckfordi Huemer & Karsholt, 2018
 Megacraspedus homochroa Le Cerf, 1932 c g
 Megacraspedus ibericus Huemer & Karsholt, 2018
 Megacraspedus imparellus (Fischer von Röslerstamm, 1843) c g
 Megacraspedus junnilaineni Huemer & Karsholt, 2018
 Megacraspedus kazakhstanicus Huemer & Karsholt, 2018
 Megacraspedus kirgizicus Huemer & Karsholt, 2018
 Megacraspedus knudlarseni Huemer & Karsholt, 2018
 Megacraspedus korabicus Huemer & Karsholt, 2018
 Megacraspedus lagopellus Herrich-Schäffer, 1860 c g
 Megacraspedus lanceolellus (Zeller, 1850) g
 Megacraspedus laseni Timossi & Huemer, 2021
 Megacraspedus latiuncus Huemer & Karsholt, 2018
 Megacraspedus lativalvellus Amsel, 1954 c g
 Megacraspedus leuca (Filipjev, 1929)
 Megacraspedus libycus Huemer & Karsholt, 2018
 Megacraspedus litovalvellus Junnilainen, 2010 g
 Megacraspedus longipalpella Junnilainen, 2010 g
 Megacraspedus longivalvellus Huemer & Karsholt, 2018
 Megacraspedus macrocanellus Lucas, 1932
 Megacraspedus majorella Caradja, 1920 c g
 Megacraspedus monolorellus Rebel, 1905 c g
 Megacraspedus multipunctellus Huemer & Karsholt, 2018
 Megacraspedus multispinella Junnilainen & Nupponen, 2010 g
 Megacraspedus neli Huemer & Karsholt, 2018
 Megacraspedus niphorrhoa (Meyrick, 1926) g
 Megacraspedus numidellus (Chrétien, 1915)
 Megacraspedus nupponeni Huemer & Karsholt, 2018
 Megacraspedus occidentellus Huemer & Karsholt, 2018
 Megacraspedus orenburgensis Junnilainen & Nupponen, 2010 g
 Megacraspedus pacificus Huemer & Karsholt, 2018
 Megacraspedus pentheres Walsingham, 1920 c g
 Megacraspedus peslieri Huemer & Karsholt, 2018
 Megacraspedus peyerimhoffi Le Cerf, 1925 c g
 Megacraspedus podolicus (Toll, 1942)
 Megacraspedus pototskii Huemer & Karsholt, 2018
 Megacraspedus pusillus Walsingham, 1903 c g
 Megacraspedus quadristictus Lhomme, 1946
 Megacraspedus ribbeella (Caradja, 1920)
 Megacraspedus serica Meyrick, 1909 c g
 Megacraspedus similellus Huemer & Karsholt, 2018
 Megacraspedus skoui Huemer & Karsholt, 2018
 Megacraspedus skulei Huemer & Karsholt, 2018
 Megacraspedus spinophallus Huemer & Karsholt, 2018
 Megacraspedus squalida Meyrick, 1926 c g
 Megacraspedus steineri Huemer & Karsholt, 2018
 Megacraspedus sumpichi Huemer & Karsholt, 2018
 Megacraspedus tabelli Huemer & Karsholt, 2018
 Megacraspedus tenuignathos Huemer & Karsholt, 2018
 Megacraspedus tenuiuncus Huemer & Karsholt, 2018
 Megacraspedus teriolensis Huemer & Karsholt, 2018
 Megacraspedus tokari Huemer & Karsholt, 2018
 Megacraspedus trineae Huemer & Karsholt, 2018
 Megacraspedus tristictus Walsingham, 1910 c g
 Megacraspedus uzunsyrtus Bidzilya & Budashkin, 2015 g
 Megacraspedus violacellum (Chrétien, 1915) c g

Data sources: i = ITIS, c = Catalogue of Life, g = GBIF, b = Bugguide.net

Questionable and former species
These Australian species are likely members of the genus group Pycnobathra Lower, 1901, and not part of Megacraspedus.

 Megacraspedus achroa Lower, 1901 c g
 Megacraspedus aenictodes Turner, 1919 c g
 Megacraspedus aphileta Meyrick, 1904 c g
 Megacraspedus argonota (Lower, 1901)
 Megacraspedus astemphella Meyrick, 1904 c g
 Megacraspedus centrosema Meyrick, 1904 c g
 Megacraspedus chalcoscia Meyrick, 1904 c g
 Megacraspedus coniodes Meyrick, 1904 c g
 Megacraspedus euxena Meyrick, 1904 c g
 Megacraspedus hoplitis Meyrick, 1904 c g
 Megacraspedus inficeta Meyrick, 1904 c g
 Megacraspedus ischnota Meyrick, 1904 c g
 Megacraspedus isotis Meyrick, 1904 c g
 Megacraspedus melitopis Meyrick, 1904 c g
 Megacraspedus niphodes (Lower, 1897) c g
 Megacraspedus oxyphanes Meyrick, 1904 c g
 Megacraspedus pityritis Meyrick, 1904 c g
 Megacraspedus platyleuca Meyrick, 1904 c g
 Megacraspedus popularis Meyrick, 1904 c g
 Megacraspedus sagittifera (Lower, 1900) c g
 Megacraspedus sclerotricha Meyrick, 1904 c g
 Megacraspedus sematacma Meyrick, 1921 c g
 Megacraspedus stratimera (Lower, 1897) c g

In addition, these accepted species probably do not belong in Megacraspedus:
 Megacraspedus calamogonus Meyrick, 1886 c g - New Zealand
 Megacraspedus exilis Walsingham, 1909 c g - Mexico
 Megacraspedus plutella (Chambers, 1874) c g b - North America

These species have been determined to be synonyms of other species:
 Megacraspedus arnaldi (Turati & Krüger, 1936) - synonym of M. violacellum (Chrétien, 1915)
 Megacraspedus culminicola Le Cerf, 1932 - synonym of M. homochroa Le Cerf, 1932
 Megacraspedus escalerellus Schmidt, 1941 - synonym of M. squalida Meyrick, 1926
 Megacraspedus grossisquammellus Chrétien, 1925 - synonym of M. lanceolellus (Zeller, 1850)
 Megacraspedus hessleriellus Rössler, 1866 - synonym of M. lanceolellus (Zeller, 1850)
 Megacraspedus incertellus Rebel, 1930 - synonym of M. dolosellus (Zeller, 1839)
 Megacraspedus kaszabianus Povolný, 1982 - synonym of M. leuca (Filipjev, 1929)
 Megacraspedus mareotidellus Turati, 1924 - synonym of M. numidellus (Chrétien, 1915)
 Megacraspedus neurophanes (Meyrick, 1926) - synonym of M. fallax (Mann, 1867)
 Megacraspedus separatellus (Fischer von Röslerstamm, 1843) - synonym of M. dolosellus (Zeller, 1839)
 Megacraspedus subdolellus Staudinger, 1859 - synonym of M. lanceolellus (Zeller, 1850)
 Megacraspedus tutti Walsingham, 1887 - synonym of M. lanceolellus (Zeller, 1850)
Data sources: i = ITIS, c = Catalogue of Life, g = GBIF, b = Bugguide.net

References

 , 2001: Megacraspedus eburnellus sp. nov. and M. dolosellus (Zeller, 1839), a case of confusion in alpine lepidopterology (Lepidoptera: Gelechiidae). Entomologische Zeitschrift 111 (8): 238-242.
 , 2010: The gelechiid fauna of the southern Ural Mountains, part I: descriptions of seventeen new species (Lepidoptera: Gelechiidae). Zootaxa 2366: 1-34. Abstract: http://www.mapress.com/zootaxa/2010/f/z02366p034f.pdf].
 ; ;  2009: Checklist of Gelechiidae (Lepidoptera) in America North of Mexico. Zootaxa, 2231: 1-39. Abstract & excerpt
 , 1982: Megacraspedus kaszabianus sp. n. aus der Mongolei (Lepidoptera, Gelechiidae). Annales historico-naturales Musei nationalis hungarici 74: 193-202. Full article: .

 
Anomologini